Sin Myong-su (born 9 December 1966) is a North Korean gymnast. He competed in seven events at the 1992 Summer Olympics.

References

1966 births
Living people
North Korean male artistic gymnasts
Olympic gymnasts of North Korea
Gymnasts at the 1992 Summer Olympics
Place of birth missing (living people)
Asian Games medalists in gymnastics
Gymnasts at the 1990 Asian Games
Asian Games bronze medalists for North Korea
Medalists at the 1990 Asian Games
20th-century North Korean people